Moraga is a town in Contra Costa County, California, in the San Francisco Bay Area. The town is named in honor of Joaquín Moraga, member of the famed Californio family. As of 2020, Moraga had a total population of 16,870 people. Moraga is the home of Saint Mary's College of California.

History

The land now called Moraga was first inhabited by the Saklan Native Americans who belonged to the Bay Miwok language group.

Joaquin Moraga was the grandson of José Joaquín Moraga, builder of the Presidio of San Francisco and founder of the pueblo that grew into the city of San Jose. Joaquin's father Gabriel Moraga was also a soldier, and an early explorer who named many of the state's rivers, including the Sacramento and San Joaquin.

Moraga is located on the 1835 Mexican Land Grant Rancho Laguna de Los Palos Colorados given to Joaquin Moraga and his cousin, Juan Bernal. Part of that grant was the property today known as Moraga Ranch. The Moraga Adobe has been preserved and is located in neighboring Orinda. Joaquin Moraga Intermediate School, a middle school in Moraga, bears his name.

In the first half of the 20th century, the line of the Sacramento Northern Railroad ran through Moraga; much of the old right-of-way is now part of the Lafayette-Moraga Regional Trail.

Moraga's first post office opened in 1886, and was closed in 1887; it reopened in 1915. In 1955, Moraga built a new post office.
Saint Mary's College of California moved to Moraga in 1928.
Moraga incorporated in 1974, when the communities of Moraga Town, Rheem, and Rheem Valley, united into one town.

In June 2017, Moraga declared a fiscal emergency, because a sinkhole in the downtown area and a failed bridge on Canyon Road were expected to cost $5 million to repair.

Geography

It is located adjacent to the cities of Lafayette and Orinda, as well as the unincorporated community of Canyon. Other nearby cities include Walnut Creek, Oakland, San Francisco, Concord and Berkeley.

Moraga is in a valley, surrounded by rolling hills. Large sections of the Lafayette-Moraga Regional Trail pass through the town.

Climate
Moraga has a Mediterranean climate, with warm, dry summers and cool, wet winters. In the summer, morning fog is a common occurrence, but it usually burns off by the late morning or early afternoon, giving way to clear skies the rest of the day. Most of the annual rainfall comes during the winter; snow is very rare, but occasional light dustings have been seen. In 2014, the southwestern US was plagued by a serious drought. Moraga was badly burdened, with high fire warnings.

Demographics

The 2010 United States Census reported that Moraga had a population of 16,016. The racial makeup of Moraga was 12,201 (76.2%) White, 277 (1.7%) African American, 31 (0.2%) Native American, 2,393 (14.9%) Asian, 25 (0.2%) Pacific Islander, 281 (1.8%) from other races, and 808 (5.0%) from two or more races. Hispanic or Latino people of any race were 1,123 persons (7.0%).

The Census reported that 14,293 people (89.2% of the population) lived in households, 1,545 (9.6%) lived in non-institutionalized group quarters, and 178 (1.1%) were institutionalized.

There were 5,570 households, out of which 1,945 (34.9%) had children under the age of 18 living in them, 3,685 (66.2%) were opposite-sex married couples living together, 418 (7.5%) had a female householder with no husband present, 165 (3.0%) had a male householder with no wife present. There were 121 (2.2%) unmarried opposite-sex partnerships, and 24 (0.4%) same-sex married couples or partnerships. 1,073 households (19.3%) were made up of individuals, and 564 (10.1%) had someone living alone who was 65 years of age or older. The average household size was 2.57. There were 4,268 families (76.6% of all households); the average family size was 2.95.

The population was spread out, with 3,474 people (21.7%) under the age of 18, 2,342 people (14.6%) aged 18 to 24, 2,193 people (13.7%) aged 25 to 44, 4,947 people (30.9%) aged 45 to 64, and 3,060 people (19.1%) who were 65 years of age or older. The median age was 45.0 years. For every 100 females, there were 89.2 males. For every 100 females age 18 and over, there were 84.6 males.

The homeowner vacancy rate was 0.7%; the rental vacancy rate was 4.1%. 12,073 people (75.4% of the population) lived in owner-occupied housing units and 2,220 people (13.9%) lived in rental housing units.

Politics

As of February 10, 2019, Moraga has 11,024 voters with 4,737 (43%) registered Democrats, 2,766 (25.1%) registered Republicans and 3,105 (28.2%) independent voters.

Education

Moraga is home to the grade schools of Los Perales Elementary, Donald L. Rheem School, Camino Pablo School, and Joaquin Moraga Intermediate School; Campolindo High School; and Saint Mary's College of California, a private college. In 2011, Moraga was named a top city to live and learn in.

Primary and secondary schools
The majority of Moraga is in the Moraga School District. That district includes:
 Camino Pablo Elementary School, grades K–5
 Los Perales Elementary School, grades K–5
 Donald L. Rheem Elementary School, grades K–5
 Joaquin Moraga Intermediate School, grades 6–8

A small section of Moraga is in Orinda Union Elementary School District.

All of Moraga is in the Acalanes Union High School District. That district includes:
Campolindo High School, grades 9–12

The Saklan School (formerly known as Saklan Valley School and The Carden School of Moraga), a private elementary school founded in 1954, is also located in Moraga. It is a co-educational school with around 155 students from preschool to 8th grade. The school is accredited by the California Association of Independent Schools (a member of the National Association of Independent Schools), and the Western Association of Schools and Colleges. It has a maximum class size of 16.

Moraga's only public high school is Campolindo High School, although some Moraga students choose to attend Miramonte High School, located just across the town border in Orinda. Both schools are part of the Acalanes Union High School District, which encompasses Moraga, Lafayette, Orinda, and parts of Walnut Creek.

Orion Academy is a private secondary school for students with conditions such as Asperger syndrome, attention deficit-hyperactivity disorder (ADHD), and nonverbal learning disorder.

Colleges and universities
Saint Mary's College of California is located just northeast of downtown Moraga; it is a Catholic university with 3,962 undergraduate and postgraduate students in the 2007–2008 school year. The college was originally located in San Francisco and then Oakland, but moved to Moraga in 1928.

Public libraries
The Moraga Library of the Contra Costa County Library is located along Saint Marys Road in Moraga.

Notable people
Conrad Bassett-Bouchard, North American Scrabble champion
Matt Biondi, Olympic gold medalist (swimming)
Corbin Burnes, Major League Baseball pitcher; attended St. Mary's college
Hans Florine, speed climber
Will Forte, actor, comedian and writer
George Harrison, 1960 Olympic gold medalist and world record holder (swimming)
Erika Henningsen, lead performer in Tony Award nominated musical, Mean Girls
Daniel Levitin, best-selling author, cognitive neuroscientist, and musician
Patty Mills, NBA player, San Antonio Spurs
Aaron Poreda, Major League Baseball pitcher
Stephen Robinson, astronaut and professor
J.R. Rotem, South African-Israeli-American record producer
Kim Vandenberg, Olympic silver medalist (swimming)
Peter Varellas, Olympic silver medalist (water polo)
Matt Vasgersian, sportscaster for MLB Network; was raised in Moraga

References

External links

 History page 
 Moraga Chamber of Commerce
 Moraga Historical Society

Incorporated cities and towns in California
Cities in Contra Costa County, California
Cities in the San Francisco Bay Area